Fuchi Patera is a patera, or a complex crater with scalloped edges, on Jupiter's moon Io. It is named after the Ainu fire goddess, Kamuy Fuchi. Its name was adopted by the International Astronomical Union in 1979. Manua Patera is located north-northeast, and Amaterasu Patera is located northeast.

References

Surface features of Io (moon)